Qinghe Xiaoyingqiao station is a subway station on the Changping line of the Beijing Subway. It opened on 4 February 2023. The station is reserved for a potential cross-platform transfer with Line 19 in the future.

History 
On July 19, 2021, in the naming plan for the stations on the southern section of the Changping Line announced by the Beijing Municipal Commission of Planning and Natural Resources, the project name for this station was Xiaoyingqiao station. In June 2022, the station was officially named Qinghe Xiaoyingqiao station.

Layout
The station has 2 underground island platforms. There are 7 exits, lettered A1, A2, B1, B2, B3, C and D. Exits B1, B2 and D are accessible via elevators.

Station Art
There are two murals on the wall of the paid area of ​​the station hall, named 'Intertwined Dreams', which depict campuses and urban commercial buildings respectively, showing the scenes of contemporary youth studying and working; another wall in the station hall is decorated with the mural painting named 'Coloured Life', using coloured pencils as the design element.

Gallery

References 

Beijing Subway stations in Haidian District